Terrorism Close Calls is an 2018 American docu-series, exploring the terrorist attacks that almost happened or were not executed as planned. Each episodes explores a declassified terrorist scheme intended to cause mass casualties.

Premise
Terrorism Close Calls explores the terrorist attacks that almost happened or were not executed as planned. Each episode follows law enforcement officers and terrorism specialists as they discuss near catastrophes and reveals the techniques, plans and tricks used by authorities to apprehend those responsible.

Cast
 David Bitkower
 Don Borelli
 Pete King

Release
It was released on October 26, 2018 on Netflix streaming.

References

External links
 
 

2010s American documentary television series
2018 American television series debuts
English-language Netflix original programming
Netflix original documentary television series
Works about terrorism